Balnabruich is a small hamlet on the east coast of Scotland, close to Dunbeath, Caithness,  Scottish Highlands and is in the Scottish council area of Highland.

References

Populated places in Caithness